Ksenija Milošević (born April 26, 1982, Belgrade, Serbia, former SFR Yugoslavia) is a Serbian singer and violinist, and a member of the girlband Beauty Queens, which was formed by gathering backing vocalists of Marija Šerifović after victory in the Eurovision Song Contest 2007.

Before the band 
Milošević was born in Belgrade in 1982. She studied the violin in the class of professor Dejan Mihailovic and graduated from the Faculty of Music Arts in Belgrade. In 2005, she received the M.A. degree. Ksenija has won many awards and performed as a soloist with prominent Serbian orchestras. Since 2001, she has been a deputy concertmaster of the Belgrade Philharmonic Orchestra. She has held the position of a concertmaster for two seasons. She participated in many international festivals with the ethno band "Ognjen and Friends".

Eurovision
In 2006, she played violin and sang backing vocals on Hari Mata Hari's song, which represented Bosnia & Herzegovina at the Eurovision Song Contest 2006. In 2007, she was a backing vocalist in Serbia's winning entry Molitva. In 2012, she played violin and sang backing vocals on Željko Joksimović's song Nije Ljubav Stvar representing Serbia at the Eurovision Song Contest 2012. Milošević was a backing vocalist in Eurovision for the fourth time for Moje 3 representing Serbia at Eurovision Song Contest 2013.

Beauty Queens 
See Beauty Queens.

Discography

With Beauty Queens

Albums
2008: TBA

Singles
2007: "Pet na jedan"
2007: "Protiv srca"
2008: "Zavet"

External links 
Beauty Queens Official Site

References

1982 births
Living people
Singers from Belgrade
21st-century Serbian women singers
University of Arts in Belgrade alumni
Eurovision Song Contest entrants of 2006
Eurovision Song Contest entrants for Bosnia and Herzegovina